Palaeonema an extinct genus of nematodes from the Early Devonian. It contains only one species, Palaeonema phyticum, and is the only member of the family Palaeonematidae. P. phyticum is the oldest known fossil nematode, and was parasitic upon the Rhynie chert plant Agalophyton.

According to George Poinar Jr. (2011), the family Palaeonematidae is placed in the order Enoplida.

References

Prehistoric protostome genera
Enoplea genera
Early Devonian animals
Devonian animals of Europe
Fossil taxa described in 2008